Steed is a working animal used as a mount (especially for warfare). 
Steed may also refer to:

People with the name
Steed Malbranque (born 1980), French footballer
Edward Steed (born 1987), British cartoonist
Joel Steed (born 1969), American football player
Maggie Steed (born 1946), British actress
Michael Steed (born 1940), British political scientist
Paul Steed (died 2012), American video game artist
Thomas W. Steed (1904–1973), American air force commander
Tom Steed (1904–1983), American politician
Trent Steed (born 1977), Australian swimmer
Wickham Steed (1871–1956), British journalist and historian

Arts, entertainment, and media

Fictional characters
Emma Steed, fictional character in the Marvel Comics universe
John Steed, fictional character in the television series The Avengers
The Steed family, the fictional main protagonists of The Work and the Glory

Other uses in arts, entertainment, and media
Steed Records, American record label
"The Steeds of Time", in the God of War II video game

Other uses
Steed, a unicorn like animal on British seal
Steed, the Yorkshire tennis partnership of Stephen Iveson and Edward Harrison
13715 Steed, main-belt asteroid
Great Wall Steed, Chinese pickup truck
Send tape echo echo delay, an audio recording effect
USS W. L. Steed (ID-3449), United States Navy tanker ship
The Steed, a 2019 film

See also
Stead (disambiguation)
Steede (disambiguation)